This is a list of supermarket chains in Angola.

 Intermarket
 AngoMart
 AngoMart Mais
 Fresmart
 Nossa Casa
 Bompreço
 Continente
 Kero
 Maxi
 Megamart
 Nosso Super Supermarkets
 OK
 Shoprite
 Usave

See also 
 List of supermarket chains in Africa
 List of supermarket chains in Algeria

References 

Angola
Angola
Supermarkets